Terry Atkinson (born 1939) is an English artist.

Atkinson was born in Thurnscoe, near Barnsley, Yorkshire.  He lives in Leamington Spa, England with his wife, artist Sue Atkinson, with whom he has frequently collaborated. In 1967, he began to teach art at the Coventry School of Art while producing conceptual works, sometimes in collaboration with Michael Baldwin. In 1968 they, together with Harold Hurrell and David Bainbridge who also taught at Coventry, formed Art & Language, a group whose influence on other artists both in the UK and in the United States is widely acknowledged. Atkinson was founder-member (with colleagues John Bowstead, Roger Jeffs and Bernard Jennings) of the group Fine-Artz (1963), and (with David Bainbridge, Michael Baldwin and Harold Hurrell) of the group Art & Language (1968–74), two of the most influential collectives in contemporary Western art.

Atkinson stopped teaching at Coventry in 1973 and the following year left Art & Language. He has since exhibited under his own name, including at the 1984 Venice Biennale.

In 1985 he was nominated for the Turner Prize and exhibited a series of paintings, including The Stone Touchers I.

"Whilst Conceptualism had been international in orientation, his 1980s output, which dealt with subjects such as class identity and English attitudes to Northern Ireland, seemed to represent a deliberate return to 'local' issues." (Caption, p. 221); "Having parted company with the British Art & Language group in the early 1970s, Terry Atkinson had, by the mid-1970s, moved away from their stringent Conceptualism to explore his working-class heritage in a set of 'history paintings'. In his First World War series (c.1974-81) he reinterpreted photographs of troops taken during the Great War, using a strategically 'botched' drawing style and satirical captions. He thereby encoded a critique of the way working-class labor was mobilized for capitalist warfare. By 1984-5 such explorations of ideological undercurrents were brought to bear on family photographs. The Stone Touchers I (1984-5) incorporates an ironically diligent 'copy' of a photograph of Atkinson's children taken during a holiday in northern France. Intrigued by the rows of war graves, they are shown flanking a stone dedicated, according to the 'key' beneath the image [shown in Hopkins, p.220], to a South African infantryman. In a mock-poetic caption Atkinson asks them: 'Do you think God is a person? If he is, is he a he? If he is, is he black or white… is he a South African, or an Argentinian …?' Britain's faded imperialism had recently been rekindled by the Falklands War, and South African apartheid was a pressing issue. Atkinson thus presented his suntanned children as inextricably (if unknowingly) implicated in such events." (Excerpt, pp. 219, 221); The full "mock-poetic caption" to this painting, as indicated on p. 220 of Hopkins, reads: "Ruby and Amber in The Gardens of their old Empire history-dressed men. Dear Ruby and Amber, Do you think God is a person? If he is, is he a he? If he is, is he black or white, or brown or yellow, or pink or orange or blue or red, or green or purple….? Do you think God is a dissident? Or is he a South African, Or an Argentinian, or an Anglo-Saxon, etc.? Do you think he's the best knower? If he is a she do you think all the he's would admit she's the best knower?"

Hopkins, David. After Modern Art: 1945-2000. Oxford History of Art. Oxford; New York: Oxford UP, 2000. (p. 220)

Atkinson's work is held in many collections, including the Tate Gallery.

Atkinson taught Fine Art at the University of Leeds.

References

External links 
Information from Château de Montsoreau-Museum of contemporary 
information from Tate Britain website
 Terry Atkinson in Artfacts.Net
 Art & Language in Artfacts.Net

1939 births
Living people
British conceptual artists
People from Thurnscoe
English contemporary artists
Art & Language